The Murder of Tom Fitzgerril is the first EP by American post rock band Constants.  It was released in 2006.

Track listing
"Walking Dead in East Texas" - 6:51
"Robotica and Lobotomy" - 8:57
"The Murder of Tom Fitzgerril" - 13:01
"When Stars Dilate" - 8:21

Personnel
 Will Benoit - guitar, vocals
 Duncan Rich - drums, samples
 Orion Wainer - bass

Additional writing by:
 Ben Fowlie - tracks 2 and 3
 Mike Repasch-Nieves - track 3

Release Details
 2006, US, Radar Recordings RDR-113, Release Date 2006, CD
 2008, US, Vega Vinyl VV-002, Release Date 20 June 2008, LP

External links
 The Band's MySpace Page
 Radar Recordings

2006 EPs
Constants (band) albums